Anu-Maija Saarela (b. 29 December 1958 in Multia) is a Finnish lawyer and diplomat.  She has been Ambassador of Finland to Tel Aviv since 2016.

Saarela came to the Ministry for Foreign Affairs in  1987. She has previously worked in the Foreign Ministry at the political, commercial, administrative and legal department. Since 2009, she served as the Head of the Department of International Law at the Ministry of Justice. In other foreign missions, Saarela has been in Berlin, Tokyo, Stockholm, Washington and Lagos. Prior to Tel Aviv, from 2012 she was the Ambassador in Nicosia, Cyprus.

References 

Ambassadors of Finland to Israel
Ambassadors of Finland to Cyprus
Finnish women lawyers
1958 births
People from Multia
Living people
Finnish women ambassadors
20th-century Finnish lawyers
21st-century Finnish lawyers